The Coordinator for International Information Programs was the head of the Bureau of International Information Programs within the United States Department of State.  The Coordinator for International Information Programs reported to the Under Secretary of State for Public Diplomacy and Public Affairs. As the head of the bureau, the Coordinator for International Information Programs had a rank equivalent to Assistant Secretary. On May 28, 2019, the Bureau of International Information Programs merged with the Bureau of Public Affairs into the Bureau of Global Public Affairs, and the duties of the position merged into the duties of the Assistant Secretary of State for Global Public Affairs.

List of Coordinators for International Information Programs

Notes

External links
Website of the Bureau of International Information Programs